The Welland Jackfish an independent, minor league baseball team based in Welland, Ontario, Canada. The Jackfish are a member of the Intercounty Baseball League, an independent baseball league established in 1919 which is not affiliated with Major League Baseball.

History
The team was founded as the St. Thomas Storm in 2000, before moving to Stratford, eventually becoming the Stratford Nationals. After two seasons as the Mississauga Twins, the franchise moved to Burlington in 2011 and was rebranded as the Burlington Bandits following the 2012 season, due to a change in ownership. In 2016, the Bandits rebranded under new ownership as the Burlington Herd and continued to play their home games at Nelson park in Burlington, Ontario.

On October 2, 2018, the Burlington Herd were approved to relocate to Welland, and renamed the Welland Jackfish.

In their first year in Welland, the Jackfish had their best regular season with a 19–17 record, and earned their first playoff series victory.

The Jackfish finished 15–15 in a condensed 2021 season, their second year. They were swept in the first round by the Barrie Baycats.

Season-by-season records

References

External links
 

Welland
Intercounty Baseball League
Baseball teams in Ontario
2009 establishments in Ontario
Baseball teams established in 2009